General elections were held in Vanuatu on 19–20 March 2020. The elections were initially intended to be held on 19 March, but logistical problems resulted in some areas voting the following day.

Electoral system
The 52 members of Parliament were elected from eight single-member constituencies and ten multi-member constituencies (of between two and seven seats) by first-past-the-post and single non-transferable vote, respectively.

Campaign
The Vanua'aku Pati launched its campaign slogan 'Lets Rebuild Vanuatu' in June 2019 and endorsed the continuation of its Kambak ("come back") policy.

In October 2019, a 'Vot Woman' campaign was launched, supporting all female candidates and calling for guaranteed 50% representation for women in parliament. No women were elected in the 2012 or 2016 elections. There were around 15 female candidates, but none were elected. The youngest woman candidate in 2020 was Litiana Kalsrap.

An important issue was the future of the lucrative but controversial citizenship by investment, or “passport sales” programs. For a price of about US $150,000, these schemes allow applicants to become citizens in months, without setting foot in the country.

Results
Although there were no confirmed cases of COVID-19 in the islands, there were concerns that fears of the pandemic could keep turnout low. Turnout at the previous election was about 57%.

Unofficial results were gradually released over the following days, with official results being announced later than usual, on 6 April, due to the death of the Chairman of the Vanuatu Electoral Commission, Martin Tete. No women were elected. Nineteen parties won one or more seats, with the Land and Justice Party becoming the largest with nine of the 52 seats. Turnout was down six percentage points from the prior elections in 2016.

By constituency

Aftermath
Due to the delay in announcing the official results, Parliament was unable to meet for its first sitting within the normal period of 21 days after the election, and instead met for the first time on 20 April. During the first meeting, Gracia Shadrack of the Leaders Party of Vanuatu was elected Speaker. Bob Loughman of the Vanua'aku Pati was elected Prime Minister, defeating former foreign minister Ralph Regenvanu of the Land and Justice Party by 31 votes to 21. Loughman's coalition government included the Vanua'aku Pati, the Union of Moderate Parties, the National United Party and other minor parties. The next day Loughman appointed the members of his government.

Subsequent by-elections

2021 Pentecost by-election
Caused by the conviction of incumbent Charlot Salwai for perjury. He was pardoned by President Tallis Obed Moses, allowing him to run for the seat. The election was held on 8 October 2021. It was won by Sumptoh Blaise Tabisurin of the Rural Development Party.

See also
List of members of the Parliament of Vanuatu (2020–2022)

References

Vanuatu
2020 in Vanuatu
Elections in Vanuatu